The World Marathon Majors (WMM) (known for sponsorship reasons as the Abbott World Marathon Majors) is a championship-style competition for marathon runners that started in 2006. A points-based competition founded on six major marathon races recognised as the most high-profile on the calendar, the series comprises annual races for the cities of Tokyo, Boston, London, Berlin, Chicago and New York. In addition, each edition of the series recognises and includes the results of the major global championship marathon held in that year, usually on a one-off lapped course. These races are the biennial World Athletics Championships Marathon, and the quadrennial Olympic Games Marathon.

History
Each World Marathon Majors series originally spanned two full calendar years; the second year of a series overlapped with the first year of the next. Starting in 2015, each series began with a defined city race and ended with the following race in the same city. So, series IX started in February 2015 at the 2015 Tokyo Marathon and ended there in February 2016 at the 2016 Tokyo Marathon. Series X started at the 2016 Boston Marathon and finished at the 2017 Boston Marathon. Series XI started at the 2017 London Marathon and finished at the 2018 London Marathon.

It began being sponsored by Abbott Laboratories in 2015. On April 26, 2017, Dalian Wanda Group Co., Ltd., one of the leading Chinese private conglomerates, announced a ten-year strategic partnership aimed at the continued growth and development of marathon events worldwide.

Beginning with Series X at the 2016 Boston Marathon, wheelchair competitions were added for men and women.

At the end of each of the first 10 WMM series the leading man and woman each won $500,000, making a total prize of one million U.S. dollars. Beginning with Series XI, the prize structure was revised so that for men and women first place became $250,000, second place $50,000 and third place $25,000. In the wheelchair division the prize money for men and women is $50,000 (first), $25,000 (second) and $10,000 (third).

Scoring system
Athletes who competed in the marathons originally received points for finishing in any of the top five places (1st place: 25 points; 2nd place: 15 points; 3rd place: 10 points; 4th place: 5 points; 5th place: 1 point). Their four highest ranks over the two-year period were counted; if an athlete scored points in more than this number, the athlete's four best races were scored. To be eligible for the jackpot, an athlete had to compete in at least one qualifying race in each calendar year of the series.

In 2015, the scoring was revised (1st place: 25 points; 2nd place: 16 points; 3rd place: 9 points; 4th place: 4 points; 5th place: 1 point). The two highest ranks during the scoring period would be counted, with only the best two if more than that number.

For the first three series if there were equal top scores at the end of the competition the tiebreakers were head-to-head competition and, if necessary, a majority vote of the five WMM race directors. This happened in the 2007–08 women's competition.

Beginning in 2009–10 season, following best head-to-head record, the following tie-breakers were implemented, in descending order: the person who achieved his or her points in the fewest races, the person who won the most qualifying races during the period, the person with the fastest average time in their scoring races, and a majority vote of the six-race directors. If the final circumstance is necessary, the race directors could award the title jointly.

Major marathons by year
The following marathons have been part of the series in each year:

Major marathons champions

Men's

Women's

Men's wheelchair

Women's wheelchair

Winners by season

Majors milestones
 Most victories – 12, Eliud Kipchoge (men); 7, Mary Keitany (women)
 Most scoring races – 13, Tsegaye Kebede, Wilson Kipsang (men); 14, Edna Kiplagat, Mary Keitany (women)
 Most lifetime scoring points – 265, Eliud Kipchoge (men); 234, Mary Keitany (women)
 Youngest winner – 20 years 281 days, Ghirmay Ghebreslassie (men); 20 years, 253 days, Xue Bai (women)
 Youngest point scorer – 18 years 302 days, Tsegaye Mekonnen (men); 19 years 233 days, Ayaka Fujimoto (women)
 Oldest winner – 38 years 350 days, Meb Keflezighi (men); 41 years 330 days, Edna Kiplagat (women)
 Oldest point scorer – 41 years 4 days, Ruggero Pertile (men); 41 years 330 days, Edna Kiplagat (women)
 Nation, most winners – 52, Kenya (men); 35, Kenya (women)

Six star finishers
Six star finishers are marathoners who have completed all 6 of the World Marathon Majors.  In 2016 following the Tokyo Marathon a Six Star Finisher Medal was introduced In July 2018 a "Reach for the Stars" campaign was launched wherein a runner could claim a star for each WMM race completed. The system allows runners to create a profile, search for their ‘stars’ and add them to their page.

Following the WMM Series XI in April 2018, the verified total of Six Star Finishers was 3,786.

See also
 World Athletics Label Road Races
 List of World Athletics Label marathon races
 List of final standings of the World Marathon Majors

Notes

References

External links
 www.worldmarathonmajors.com

 
Marathons
Recurring sporting events established in 2006
Annual athletics series